Statistics of Nemzeti Bajnokság I for the 1917–18 season.

Overview
It was contested by 12 teams, and MTK Hungária FC won the championship.

League standings

Results

References
Hungary - List of final tables (RSSSF)

1917-18
1917–18 in European association football leagues
1917–18 in Hungarian football